Howard W. Mattson (May 15, 1927 – May 21, 1998) was the third Executive Vice President of the Institute of Food Technologists (IFT), serving in that capacity from 1987 until his 1991 retirement. Prior to that, he had served in public relations and later became an advocate of organ transplant after his 1991 IFT retirement.

Early life and career
A native of Duluth, Minnesota, Mattson earned his B.S. in 1949 at the University of Michigan. After graduation, he worked as a chemist for Allied Chemical Company, then he shifted his focus to public relations.

Public relations prior to IFT
Mattson first started his career in public relations as an assistant advertising manager for the Bristol Company, then went to work for Bell Telephone Laboratories as editor and technical information supervisor. After his work at Bell, Mattson worked as an associate editor for International Science and Technology and then worked as director of corporate public relations for Monsanto Company in St. Louis, Missouri. Mattson would remain with Monsanto until 1973 when he joined IFT.

IFT service
Hired by Executive Director Calvert L. Willey in 1973, Mattson would be named as Director of Public Information (called Vice President of Communications as of 2006). Upon Willey's retirement in 1987, Mattson would be promoted to Executive Director. He would hold that position until the 1991 Annual Meeting in Dallas, Texas when he suffered a heart attack. The attack would force Mattson to retire and undergo a heart transplant.

Retirement and post-IFT service
Mattson would retire to Flat Rock, North Carolina (between Asheville, North Carolina and Greenville, South Carolina) where he joined Pinecrest Associate Reformed Presbyterian Church (ARP). During his time, Mattson became an accomplished photographer, even having a photo of his make the cover of the ARP Magazine in November 1996. One of his fellow churchgoers at Pinecrest was Buffalo Bob Smith of Howdy Doody television fame in the 1950s. He also remained involved with IFT by volunteering in an organ donor program and was seen at the IFT Annual Meeting from 1992 to 1997.

Death
Mattson died in Asheville, North Carolina on May 21, 1998 of a heart attack following battles with pneumonia and lung infections. A memorial service was held in Flat Rock on June 6, 1998.

References

"In Memoriam: Howard W. Mattson." Food Technology. July 1998: p. 116.

1927 births
1998 deaths
20th-century American chemists
American magazine editors
Heart transplant recipients
People from Duluth, Minnesota
People from Chicago
People from Asheville, North Carolina
University of Michigan alumni
20th-century American non-fiction writers
Journalists from Illinois
People from Flat Rock, Henderson County, North Carolina
20th-century American journalists
American male journalists
20th-century American male writers